Coromandel is a mining area in Kolar Gold Fields(KGF), Karnataka, India. Where major mining units are located.

History
Before the arrival of British this land was vast plains with ups and downs. The people were in a few numbers in this semi-arid landscape, British later took rights from the Maharaja of Mysore and started mining in small scale and later they imported machinery and equipment from the London. Mining started in massive production of gold in the depth of gold pits.

Population
The majority of people came from Tamil Nadu. The British brought them here to work in the gold mine around the 1860s, because near by villagers refused to work in depth of gold pits and only few Telugu speaking people came from Chittor, Kuppam which is near to Kolar Gold Fields.

Mining shaft
During the British rule Coromandel is the major part in exaction of gold. In the early 1990s there were around 10 to 12 shafts. Some of the major shafts are.
Golconda shaft new &old,
Balaghat shaft,
Henry’s shaft,
Road block, 
commercial shaft. After the end of British rule some of the shafts are abandoned, BGML is undertaken by Government of India. In the early 1900s they was only huts, between 1940-1950's they build the concrete houses all over the coromandel. It was the time of golden era, they paid good salary at time. The cost of living is very high compared to the nearby villagers, only the mining area as power supply with street lights, they were no power around of Kolar gold fields. It’s believed once that the light source from the Kolar gold fields is seen from kolar during the night. In the 2000s the government of India announced to close BGML due to the exhaust of gold deposit. It was the time of sorrow many worker lost they jobs, without any settlement, all sorts of strikes were went down.

Colonies

Education Institute
Coromandel has educational institutions from the lower to higher education, but many schools are in a critical position due to lack of students. Some school have shut in the past 10 years like government Tamil medium school NTM school in Balaghat, Tank block.
School's
     Good shepered school.
     NTM School (closed)
     Golden Hills school(closed)

Technical Institution's

Government office

Wildlife
Coromandel is covered with mining quarters, so there is little wildlife. But there are wild animals in the outskirts. In the edges of Balaghat colony there is an immense landscape - a  square mile of mining area. This is called "Balaghat Black Bucks Reserve" (BBR), which is inhabited by Black deer. Blacks bucks are protected by the Government of India due to the illegal poaching for their valuable skin, antler’s and meat. The black deer is being threatened with extinction in the conservation ranking. Hunting of black bucks is an illegal act with punishment of imprisonment of up-to 10 years under the wildlife protecting act of 1972. In BBR there are more than 50- 70 deer but  that number is declining due to wild dogs that hunt in pack’s, targeting the fawns. There are also wild boar’s which are nocturnal animals.
Mammals 
Birds 
Reptiles
Insects

Other place

Cities and towns in Kolar district